D'slove Tour is the second Japanese tour by South Korean singer Daesung, member of Big Bang. It was attended by over 170,000 people, making it the highest attendance in a Japanese national tour held by a Korean soloist at the time. This tour also made Daesung the first Korean soloist to gather over 100,000 fans in Japan for two consecutive years.

History
In early 2014, YG Entertainment announced that Daesung will embark on a second Japan tour, and announced a total of 12 shows across 7 cities. More than 200,000 people applied for the tickets, which resulted in an additional performance at Nippon Budoukan and two additional shows at Osaka-jo Hall. He was expected to be joined by 138,000 fans. The tour officially commenced with two shows at Yokohama Arena which was attended by 34,000 fans.

After successfully completing his solo arena tour "D’slove", gathering 170,000 fans from 15 concerts in eight cities, Daesung launched the encore concert in Yoyogi National Gymnasium and Osaka Jo Hall. Japanese singer Linda Yamamoto made a special appearance.

Special guests
Linda Yamamoto

Set list

 Sunny Hill
 Powerful Boy
 I Love You
 Love
 Rainy Rainy
 Awake, Asleep
 Old Diary 
 Mr. Children
 Wings 
 Missing You Now
 Try Smiling
 The Flower Bud Of My Dream
 Baby Don’t Cry
 Joyful
 Hello

Encore
 Look at Me, Gwisoon
 Fantastic Baby
 Powerful Boy
 Wings
 Singer's Ballad

Tour dates

References

External links
Official Site
YG Entertainment
Big Bang Japan Official Site

2014 concert tours
2015 concert tours
Daesung concert tours